Shamil Zagitovich Sultanov (16 May 1952 – 18 February 2022) was a Russian politician. A member of Rodina, he served in the State Duma from 2003 to 2007. He died on 18 February 2022, at the age of 69.

References

1952 births
2022 deaths
People from Andijan
21st-century Russian politicians
Fourth convocation members of the State Duma (Russian Federation)
Rodina (political party) politicians
Moscow State Institute of International Relations alumni